General elections were held in Kenya Colony on 2 April 1924. The elections were the first under a new Constitution which saw suffrage extended to Indians and Arabs, who were allotted five and one elected seat in the Legislative Council respectively, alongside the eleven elected seats for the white population, although appointed members were still the majority. Whilst all adult Indian residents were given the right to vote, in the Arab community only men literate in Arabic or Swahili and resident in the country for two years were enfranchised, as the community had requested that women not be given the right to vote. One member was appointed to represent the majority black population.
     
The Reform Party was one of the parties to contest the election in the white community.

Results
Despite their enfranchisement, the Indian community boycotted the election after their leaders forbade registration in protest at being placed on a separate roll to the White voters and the small number of seats given to Indians relative to Whites. As a result no Indians took their seats in the Council.

Appointed members

Aftermath
The newly elected Legislative Council met for the first time on 14 May 1924.

References

1924 elections in Africa
1924 in Kenya
1924
Legislative Council of Kenya
1924
April 1924 events